Morton Hill is a mountain located in the Catskill Mountains of New York north of Roscoe. Rodgers Hill is located southeast of Morton Hill and Cherry Ridge is located northwest.

References

Mountains of Delaware County, New York
Mountains of New York (state)